Farm River is a south-flowing river located entirely within the U.S. state of Connecticut. Because it begins as freshwater in its northern reaches and flows into tidal salt water at Long Island Sound, Farm River is by definition an estuary.

Sources
The USGS identifies the river's headwaters as an area below the southeast flank of Pistapaug Mountain in the town of North Branford. The Friends of the Farm River Estuary name the river's source as Pistapaug Pond, a reservoir straddling the town lines of Wallingford, Durham and North Branford, below the west flank of Pistapaug Mountain.

Course

From its northern reaches, the river flows southward into the town of East Haven where it becomes the dividing line between East Haven and Branford. Along its route, the river supplies water via tunnel to Lake Saltonstall, a public water source owned by the South Central Connecticut Regional Water Authority. Near the river's mouth it flows past Farm River State Park.

Other names
The USGS lists among the river's many alternate names Beaver River, Deborah River, Deborah's Stream, East Haven River, Foxon River, Great River, Ironworks River, Mainnuntaquck, Moe River, Muddy River, Scotch Cap River, Stony River, and Tapamshasick. The name Farm River was officially decided upon in 1968.

References

External links
Friends of the Farm River Estuary
The Farm River Estuary River Guide Friends of the Farm River Estuary

Rivers of Connecticut
Rivers of New Haven County, Connecticut
Long Island Sound
Estuaries of Connecticut
Geography of New Haven, Connecticut
Wallingford, Connecticut
North Branford, Connecticut
Branford, Connecticut
East Haven, Connecticut
Durham, Connecticut